The Jingmen A2C Ultra Seaplane is a Chinese three-seat ultralight aircraft that was designed by the China Avionics Research Institute (the 605 Institute) and produced by Jingmen Aviation of Jingmen, introduced in 2003.

Design and development
The A2C was designed to comply with the Civil Aviation Authority of China rules. It was given a Chinese type authority on 18 July 2003 and a production certificate in 2004. It was designed for the agricultural aircraft, aerial photography, search and rescue, communications and sport roles.

The design features a strut-braced high-wing, a three-seat open cockpit with a windshield, fixed tricycle landing gear or floats and a single engine in pusher configuration.

The aircraft is made from bolted-together aluminum tubing, with its flying surfaces covered in Dacron sailcloth. The standard engine used is the certified  Rotax 912A2 four-stroke powerplant.

Almost 100 had been delivered by 2016.

Operational history
Reviewer Marino Boric described the design in a 2015 review as having a "big load capacity, economy, safe and reliable".

Variants
A2C
Seaplane model
A2C-L
Landplane model with tricycle landing gear.

Specifications (A2C)

References

External links
Photo of an A2C

A2C
2000s Chinese ultralight aircraft
Single-engined pusher aircraft